The Women's 100 metres T44 event at the 2012 Summer Paralympics took place at the London Olympic Stadium on 1 and 2 September.

Results

Round 1
Competed 1 September 2012 from 19:33. Qual. rule: first 3 in each heat (Q) plus the 2 fastest other times (q) qualified.

Heat 1

Heat 2

Final
Competed 2 September 2012 at 21:32.

 
Q = qualified by place. q = qualified by time. WRC = World Record for athlete's classification. PB = Personal Best. SB = Seasonal Best.

References

Athletics at the 2012 Summer Paralympics
2012 in women's athletics
Women's sport in London